Jamielnik  is a village in the administrative district of Gmina Nowe Miasto Lubawskie, within Nowe Miasto County, Warmian-Masurian Voivodeship, in northern Poland.

The village has an approximate population of 1,000.

References

Jamielnik